Gene Ess is a Japanese-American jazz guitarist. He was a member of the Rashied Ali Quintet, working with Ravi Coltrane, Archie Shepp, Lonnie Plaxico, and Reggie Workman.

Career 
Ess was born Gene Shimosato in Tokyo, Japan, and raised in Okinawa on an American military base. In his early teens, he was a performing musician in Okinawa. He studied classical music at George Mason University, then attended Berklee College of Music, where he became interested in jazz, particularly the music of John Coltrane.

Ess moved to New York City and became a member of a band led by Rashied Ali. He toured with Ali and recorded on his album No One in Particular. While in this group, he played with Ravi Coltrane, Eddie Henderson, Carlos Santana, Archie Shepp, and Reggie Workman

Ess's album Modes of Limited Transcendence (2009) received the 2010 SESAC Outstanding Jazz Performance Award. The album includes compositions by Ess and pianist Tigran Hamasyan. In 2012, he released A Thousand Summers, which contains vocals by Nicki Parrott.

Following this, Ess released Fractal Attraction (2013), which continues his exploration of voice in a chamber group setting. The album was recorded with Thana Alexa on vocals, David Berkman on piano, Thomas Kneeland on drums, and Gene Jackson on drums. Ess has also worked with Al Foster, Slide Hampton, Dave Liebman, and Clark Terry.

References

External links
 Official site

Year of birth missing (living people)
Living people
American musicians of Japanese descent
American jazz guitarists